Vettangulam is a big village located in Nemili panchayat, [ Ranipet district]], Tamil Nadu, on the banks of kosasthalai river.

It belongs to Arakkonam parliamentary constituency and Sholinghur (state assembly constituency).  It is one of the peaceful villages with pristine environment .

Agriculture and secondary sector employment are helpful in meeting the basic needs of people.

The major businesses are farming...Totally more than 500 acres farming lands are present in vettankulam village...

Women have a greater role in economic spending decisions of their family income since their contribution is almost equal to their spouse. Main source of income & investment for women are through farm and non farm labour, National Rural Employment Guarantee Act, 2005,  and Self-help group.

Villages in Vellore district